= Kumbapur-M-Narendra =

- Village
- Country: India
- State: Karnataka
- District: Dharwad

Government
  - Type: Panchayat raj
  - Body: Gram panchayat

Population (2011)
  - Total: 1,481

Languages
  - Official: Kannada
- Time zone: UTC+5:30 (IST)
- ISO 3166 code: IN-KA
- Vehicle registration: KA
- Website: karnataka.gov.in

Kumbapur-M-Narendra is a village in Dharwad district of Karnataka, India.

== Demographics ==
As of the 2011 Census of India there were 336 households in Kumbapur-M-Narendra and a total population of 1,481 consisting of 782 males and 699 females. There were 188 children ages 0-6.
